The South Jacksonville Grammar School (also known as The Lofts San Marco) is a historical school building in Jacksonville, Florida, United States. It is located at 1450 Flagler Avenue. On April 15, 2004, it was added to the U.S. National Register of Historical Places.

References

External links
 Duval County listings at National Register of Historic Places
 The Lofts San Marco history

Buildings and structures in Jacksonville, Florida
Public elementary schools in Florida
History of Jacksonville, Florida
National Register of Historic Places in Jacksonville, Florida
Residential buildings in Jacksonville, Florida
School buildings completed in 1916
1916 establishments in Florida